Jill Parr (born in Burton, Michigan) is a contemporary Christian musician.

Biography
Jill Parr is a Christian recording artist with four albums. Her self-titled debut was released in 1999 on Absolute Records. The second album, Orbit, was released on September 23, 2003 (Christian Records) with the title track charting on Christian radio playlists. After the collapse of Christian Records, following the release of the Orbit album, Jill and husband/producer, Brian Hardin, formed Whiplash Records. Parr's latest album, Me Again, was released on Whiplash Records in the fall of 2006. The album's first single, "Reach", reached the top 10 on the Radio & Records Christian CHR chart.

Jill is married to producer/record label executive Brian Hardin.

Mission statement
"My mission is to fear God, to let the roots of faith go deep, to trust without question and to encourage others along the same path. My heart is to recapture the imagination of women stuck in the mundane; to reclaim the dreams that God has given and to dare those who have never felt purpose for their lives to learn what God has placed them here for. My passion is to remind people how God looks on them with love and longing and I'm out to accomplish this one person at a time. " (Jill Parr, Official MySpace Page, 2006.)

Discography
1998:  Jill Parr
2003:  Orbit
2006:  Me Again
2016:  I Still Want More

References

External links

Jill Parr
Whiplash Records, Jill's record label
Brian Hardin; Jill's husband and producer
Prodigal Son Entertainment, Jill's management

American performers of Christian music
American women singers
Living people
People from Burton, Michigan
Year of birth missing (living people)
21st-century American women